Gellar-e Mohammad Hasan (also Romanized as Gellar-e Moḩammad Ḩasan) is a village in Meshgin-e Gharbi Rural District, in the Central District of Meshgin Shahr County, Ardabil Province, Iran. At the 2006 census, its population was 320, in 70 families.

References 

Towns and villages in Meshgin Shahr County